Rafael Solis may refer to:

 Rafael Solis (boxer) (born 1959), former lightweight boxer from Puerto Rico
 Rafael Solis, former member of Mexican musical group AK-7
 Rafael Solís (jurist), former Nicaraguan Supreme Court Justice